Royd Anderson (born July 22, 1972, New Orleans, Louisiana) is a Cuban-American filmmaker and historian based in New Orleans, Louisiana. He specializes in documentary films pertaining to tragic Louisiana events often overlooked by historians.

Career
In 2006, Anderson wrote and directed the documentary The Luling Ferry Disaster for his Master's thesis project in Communication at the University of Louisiana at Lafayette.  The film recounts the story of  the MV George Prince ferry disaster, the worst ferryboat accident in U.S. history with 77 fatalities. The documentary was released on the 30th anniversary of the disaster on October 20, 2006.  The success of the film generated a movement, initiated by Anderson, to build a monument in St. Charles Parish for the victims and survivors.  The Luling/Destrehan Ferry Disaster Memorial Committee, led by St. Charles Parish Councilman Larry Cochran, was established on January 28, 2009, consisting of family members and friends of the deceased, St. Charles Parish Council members, and concerned citizens, along with Anderson.  Through the work of the bureau, a memorial was finally erected. It was unveiled in a solemn ceremony on October 17, 2009 at the East Bank Bridge Park in Destrehan, Louisiana.  St. Charles Parish Councilman and architect Paul J. Hogan designed the monument.

In 2007, Anderson wrote and directed the documentary The Continental Grain Elevator Explosion.  The film documents the deadliest grain dust explosion of the modern era, occurring on December 22, 1977 at the Continental Grain plant in Westwego, Louisiana. 36 lives were lost.

Pan Am Flight 759 is Anderson's third documentary, released in 2012.  The film examines the worst plane crash in Louisiana history, occurring on July 9, 1982 in the city of Kenner.  At 76 minutes, it is his longest film to date.  An edited-for-TV version of the documentary (58 mins.) was aired on Cox 4 in three Louisiana regions: New Orleans, Baton Rouge, and Acadiana.

Anderson's 4th film, The Upstairs Lounge Fire, documents the 1973 UpStairs Lounge arson attack in New Orleans. The documentary was released on June 24, 2013 to commemorate the 40th anniversary of the fire.

His 2019 documentary, Mother's Day Bus Crash on 610, investigates the worst vehicular accident in Louisiana history, occurring on May 9, 1999 on Interstate 610 in New Orleans. 22 perished.

On November 22, 2021, Anderson released his first book, New Orleans Disasters: Firsthand Accounts of Crescent City Tragedy, published by The History Press.  It explores seven tragedies and their fallout through gripping firsthand interviews, planting readers amid the chaos.  The book peaked at number four in Amazon's 'New Releases in Disaster Relief' category in December 2021.

In 2022, Anderson wrote and directed his sixth documentary, The Rault Center Fire. The film documents the New Orleans high-rise disaster that occurred on November 29, 1972.  Six lives were lost.

Awards and honors

Anderson's films The Luling Ferry Disaster and The Continental Grain Elevator Explosion were honored at the Pelican d'Or Short Film Festival at Nunez Community College, winning the Best Documentary category in 2007 and 2008.  He was awarded Delgado Community College's Circles of Excellence Outstanding Alumni Award in 2011.  At the 2013 Lake Charles Film Festival, Pan Am Flight 759 won the Best Documentary category.  The UpStairs Lounge Fire was selected the best Documentary Short of the Boomtown Film & Music Festival in Beaumont, Texas in 2016.

Anderson was invited to Princeton University as a guest speaker to screen and discuss The UpStairs Lounge Fire in 2014.  He was also an invited guest speaker at Tulane University, Loyola University New Orleans, and the FBI New Orleans Division.  His documentaries have  been accepted into The Historic New Orleans Collection, one of Louisiana's prestigious archives.

Personal life
On television, Anderson has been a featured guest on the LMN (TV channel)'s show Ghost Inside My Child, the Louisiana Public Broadcasting network show Louisiana: The State We're In, the WYES-TV news program Informed Sources, WGNO ABC 26's Good Morning New Orleans, and Netflix's show Animal House.  He is an alumnus of Loyola University New Orleans,  the University of Louisiana at Lafayette, and Delgado Community College. In addition to being a filmmaker, Anderson is also a former high school teacher.

Filmography
2006 The Luling Ferry Disaster
2007 The Continental Grain Elevator Explosion
2012 Pan Am Flight 759
2013 The Upstairs Lounge Fire
2019 Mother's Day Bus Crash on 610
2022 The Rault Center Fire

References

External links
 "St. Charles Herald Guide" Former HHS teacher featured in reincarnation documentary on Lifetime
 Loyola University New Orleans "The Maroon" Documentarian alumnus presents his film
 "Times-Picayune" Pan Am jet crash in Kenner is remembered in new documentary
 New Orleans "Times-Picayune" Remembering Flight 759's victims: Editorial
 "St. Charles Herald Guide" Ex-bandmates team up to find missing ferry bell
 "Princeton University Program In Gender And Sexuality Studies" Documentary Screening: The UpStairs Lounge Fire with a Talk Back with Film Director, Royd Anderson
 New Orleans "Times-Picayune" UpStairs Lounge fire provokes powerful memories 40 years later
 New Orleans "Times-Picayune" New documentary recalls 1973 UpStairs Lounge fire 
 "St. Charles Herald Guide" Former HHS teacher sheds light on tragic French Quarter arson
 Delgado Community College Alumni Newsletter "Circles of Excellence Honorees"
 Orlando mass shooting is a haunting reminder of Upstairs Lounge arson (June 6, 2016)
 Arson At The UpStairs Lounge (July 28, 2016)
 "WWL-TV" 'I woke up every night fighting the river: Luling Ferry survivor tells his story 
 "WWL-TV" 40 years ago today: Luling ferry disaster claimed 78 lives 
 "St. Charles Herald Guide" 40 years later, disaster aftermath tough for survivors, victim families
 "WWL-TV" 40 years ago today: Continental Grain elevator explosion
 "The New Orleans Advocate" Continental Grain elevator explosion film to screen Friday, on 40th anniversary
 "Gambit" Documentary screens on 40th anniversary of Westwego disaster
 "L'Observateur" Documentary looks at Mother's Day bus crash 20 years later
 "St. Charles Herald Guide" Through his films, former Hahnville High teacher connects past to present
 "WWNO - New Orleans NPR affiliate" Sorting Out The Truth
 "Your Film Professor" Royd Anderson: Seeing the Human Spirit in Tragedy
 The Scoot Show With Scoot: Scoot brings on Royd Anderson to talk about his documentary about the Rault Center fire. (January 19, 2023)

American film directors
Living people
1972 births
Artists from New Orleans
Loyola University New Orleans alumni
University of Louisiana at Lafayette alumni
American people of Cuban descent